Brahmana Periya-Agraharam is a neighborhood in the city of Erode, Tamil Nadu, India. It functioned as an independent Village Panchayat until the corporation expansion in 2011. It is now a part of Erode Municipal Corporation. It is located 7 km from Erode Junction and 4 km from Central Bus Terminus, Erode.

Demographics
At the 2001 India census, Brahmana Periya (BP) Agraharam had a population of 27,275. Males constitute 51% of the population and females 49%. Brahmana Periya-Agraharam had an average literacy rate of 64%, higher than the national average of 59.5%; with male literacy of 71% and female literacy of 57%. 12% of the population were under 6 years of age.

References

Neighbourhoods in Erode